RCA Studio A is a music recording studio in Nashville, Tennessee built and founded in 1964 by Chet Atkins, Owen Bradley and Harold Bradley. Originally known simply by the name "RCA Victor Nashville Sound Studios" (or “RCA Studios” for short), along with adjacent RCA Studio B, it became known in the 1960s for becoming an essential factor and location to the development of the musical  production style and sound engineering technique known as the Nashville Sound.

In 2015, it was added to the National Register of Historic Places. Since 2016, it houses Low Country Sound, a record label imprint run by Dave Cobb.

History
Studio A was built in 1965 based on ideas of Chet Atkins, Owen Bradley and Harold Bradley and operated by RCA Records until 1977. Despite its name, Studio A is actually newer than the adjacent RCA Studio B which was built in 1956. Studios A and B were collectively referred to as RCA Victor Nashville Sound Studios.

The building was continuously used by RCA until 1977, when they closed their Nashville offices and sold their properties located on Music Row.

In 2002, the building was leased by Ben Folds for his Grand Victor Sound company and became also known as Ben's Place. He leased the building for twelve years. Folds rented out parts of the building to other artists, such as Jamey Johnson.

Demolition controversy
The studio grounds passed through multiple owners until in 2014 when the building’s existence was threatened with demolition by a local developer to make way for condominiums.

At this time, Ben Folds gathered regional and professional support, enabling Curb Records founder, Mike Curb, and local philanthropists Chuck Elcan and Aubrey Preston to collectively purchase the building, which became paramount to preserving its historic significance.

The efforts to save RCA Studio A led to a more consolidated, dedicated and collaborative effort to preserve the musical history and promote creativity within Music Row and the  Nashville area. It also led to the establishment of grassroots preservationist organizations such as the Music Industry Coalition.

Historic landmark
In 2015, Studio A joined Studio B in the National Register of Historic Places. While Studio B became a tourist attraction and learning facility, Studio A continues to be in use by recording artists to this day.

In early 2016, country music record producer Dave Cobb took over the building from Folds for his Low Country Sound record label imprint.

Production style

Quonset Hut Studio, RCA Studio B, and RCA Studio A were essential locations to the development of the "Nashville Sound." Owen Bradley, Chet Atkins, Bob Ferguson, and Bill Porter produced studio recordings in the Nashville Sound style, a sophisticated style characterized by background vocals and strings. The Nashville Sound both revived the popularity of country music and helped establish Nashville's reputation as an international recording center, with these three studios at the center of what would become known as Music Row.

Designed and built later than Quonset Hut Studio and RCA Studio B, Studio A's gym-sized room, large enough to house choirs, orchestras, string sections and a live band, was specifically designed by John E. Volkmann to more easily facilitate recording the large ensembles needed to create the Nashville Sound. Today, it is the last remaining of only three Volkmann-designed rooms of this size.

List of notable artists recorded 
Notable artists who recorded songs at Studio A include:

 The Beach Boys
 Tony Bennett
 Joe Cocker
 Brent Cobb
 Ben Folds
 Alan Jackson
 Waylon Jennings
 Jamey Johnson
 B.B. King
 Miranda Lambert
 Loretta Lynn
Jason Isbell
 The Monkees
 Amanda Palmer
 Dolly Parton
 Rival Sons
 Leon Russell
 William Shatner
 Chris Stapleton
 George Strait
 Zach Bryan
 Paramore
 Porter Wagoner
 Slash
 Wheeler Walker Jr.

References 

Recording studios in Tennessee
Nashville, Tennessee
RCA Records